Ngāi Tahu is a Māori tribe in southern New Zealand.

Ngāi Tahu may also refer to:

 Ngāi Tahu (Ngāti Kahungunu), a Ngāti Kahungunu sub-tribe
 Ngāi Tahu (Rangitāne), a Rangitāne sub-tribe